Ratnasambhava (lit. "Jewel-Born") is one of the Five Dhyani Buddhas (or "Five Meditation Buddhas") of Mahayana and Vajrayana or Tantric Buddhism. Ratnasambhava's mandalas and mantras focus on developing equanimity and equality and, in Vajrayana Buddhist thought is associated with the attempt to destroy greed and pride. His consort is Mamaki and his mount is a horse or a pair of lions.

Textual History
The first documented mention of Ratnasambhava is found in the Suvarṇaprabhāsa Sūtra and in the Guhyasamāja Tantra (4th Century CE), and he subsequently appears in a number of Vajrayana texts. The most elaborate account of him is to be found in the Pañcakara section of the Advayavajrasaṃgraha.

In the Śūraṅgama mantra (Chinese: 楞嚴咒; pinyin: Léngyán Zhòu) taught in the Śūraṅgama sutra (Chinese: 楞嚴經; pinyin: Léngyán Jīng), an especially influential dharani in the Chinese Chan tradition, Ratnasambhava is mentioned to be the host of the Jewel-creating Division in the South, one of the five major divisions which controls the vast demon armies of the five directions.

Ratnasambhava is also mentioned as one of the Buddhas worthy of praise in the Kṣitigarbha Bodhisattva Pūrvapraṇidhāna Sūtra, chapter 9:

Characteristics 

Ratnasaṃbhava is associated with the skandha of feeling or sensation and its relationship with consciousness. His activity in promoting Buddhism is enriching and increasing knowledge of Dharma. Ratnasambhava is associated with the jewel symbol, which corresponds with his family, Ratna or jewel. In artwork he is shown in the mudra of giving.

He is usually coloured yellow or gold. He is associated with the element earth, the heavenly quarter of the south and the season of spring. His cardinal direction is the south. His Buddha field is known as Śrimat.

In the Bardo Thodol, he is depicted in union with Mamaki and attended by the male bodhisattvas Ākāśagarbha and Samantabhadra and the female bodhisattvas Mala and Dhupa.

In Tibet, Vaiśravaṇa, also known as Jambhala and Kubera, is considered a worldly dharmapāla, and is often depicted as a member of the retinue of Ratnasambhava.

His wrathful manifestation is the Wisdom King Gundari.

Notes

 Mythology of India: Myths of India, Sri Lanka and Tibet, Rachel Storm, Anness Publishing Limited, Editor Helen Sudell, Page 69, Column 1, Lines 9–18, Caption, Page 69, Column 4, Lines 1–4
 Five Dhyani Buddhas Table 1, Row 4, Columns 1–5, Table 2, Row 2, Columns 1–12

References 

Buddhas

de:Adibuddha#Ratnasambhava